Guts for Love is an album by Garland Jeffreys, released by Epic Records in 1983. It was produced by Bob Clearmountain and Jeffreys. Due to record company issues, the album was released a year later than originally scheduled.

The album peaked at No. 176 on the Billboard 200.

Critical reception
Robert Christgau wrote that "Jeffreys's odd weakness for rock without roll is the ruination of this overproduced, undercomposed anachronism—even the reggae grooves are tinged with synthesized AOR melodrama, and the dance numbers do not jump jump." The Boston Globe called Guts for Love "a standout album," writing that "it has a snappy live feel, for nine of the songs were laid down in two takes, the other in three."

Track listing
All tracks composed by Garland Jeffreys; except where indicated
 "Real Man" - 3:41
 "Surrender" - 3:56
 "Fidelity" - 4:21
 "Rebel Love" - 3:03
 "Dance Up" (Garland Jeffreys, Alan Freedman) - 3:08
 "Guts for Love" - 3:39
 "Shout" - 5:05
 "What Does It Take (To Win Your Love)" (Johnny Bristol, Harvey Fuqua, Vernon Bullock) - 2:46
 "Loneliness" - 3:46
 "El Salvador" - 4:32
 "American Backslide" - 3:51

Personnel 
Garland Jeffreys – guitars, percussion, vocals
Robin Clark – backing vocals
Dennis Davis – drums, percussion
Lew Del Gatto – horns
Tyrone Downie – keyboards
Larry Fast – piano, synthesizer
Alan "Taff" Freedman – guitars
Diva Gray – backing vocals
Paul Griffin – keyboards
Gordon Grody – backing vocals
Lani Groves – backing vocals
Tony Levin – bass
Tom "Bones" Malone – trombone
Lou Marini – saxophone
Jimmy Maelen – percussion
Hugh McCracken – guitars, harmonica, classical guitar on "El Salvador"
Alan Rubin – trumpet
David Sanborn – alto saxophone solo on "What Does It Take (To Win Your Love)" 
G.E. Smith – guitars, bass
David Van Tieghem – percussion, marimba

References

1983 albums
Garland Jeffreys albums
Albums produced by Bob Clearmountain
Epic Records albums